William Ribeiro Soares (born 7 February 1985) is a Brazilian footballer who plays as a center-back.

Club career
On 31 August 2016, Soares signed a one-year contract with Belgian club Standard Liège, with an option to extend for an extra season.

On 25 January 2017, Soares returned to Hapoel Be'er Sheva.

On 29 July 2017 Cypriot First Division club Omonia Nicosia announced the signing of Soares. He made his debut on 10 September 2017 against Ethnikos Achna on the 2017-18 season's premier.

After only one season in Cyprus he returned to Portugal, with Académica.

Club career statistics
''(correct as of August 2015)

 Only Israeli club career statistics

Honours

Club
 Hapoel Be'er Sheva
 Premier League: 2015–16 ,2016-17

References

External links
 

1985 births
Sportspeople from Minas Gerais
Living people
Brazilian footballers
Association football midfielders
Associação Académica de Coimbra – O.A.F. players
Gil Vicente F.C. players
S.C. Braga players
C.D. Fátima players
Hakoah Maccabi Amidar Ramat Gan F.C. players
Hapoel Ramat Gan F.C. players
Hapoel Be'er Sheva F.C. players
Standard Liège players
AC Omonia players
Primeira Liga players
Liga Portugal 2 players
Liga Leumit players
Israeli Premier League players
Belgian Pro League players
Cypriot First Division players
Brazilian expatriate footballers
Brazilian expatriate sportspeople in Portugal
Brazilian expatriate sportspeople in Israel
Brazilian expatriate sportspeople in Belgium
Brazilian expatriate sportspeople in Cyprus
Expatriate footballers in Portugal
Expatriate footballers in Israel
Expatriate footballers in Belgium
Expatriate footballers in Cyprus